2019 Lithuanian Football Cup, SHARP LFF Cup was the 31st independent Lithuania and the 74th overall national football cup tournament.

The tournament started on 26 April 2019, and the final took place on 29 September 2019.

The competition format is a single-elimination tournament, all ties are contested in a single match.

The cup winners qualify for the 2020–21 UEFA Europa League. The defending champions were FK Žalgiris.

Participants 

Participation in the competition is mandatory for all clubs of the top three tiers (A Lyga, LFF I Lyga, LFF II Lyga). Teams of lower divisions are eligible to apply for participation if they meet licensing criteria. The reserve teams are not allowed to participate in the cup competition.

The application submission deadline was the 5 April 2019. The deadline was extended to 15 April due to increased interest in the competition from the lower divisions, which are getting refereeing costs paid by the LFF this year.

A total of 62 teams enrolled to the competition, the match draw took place on 18 April 2019. During the draw the organizers realized that technical errors were made, and subsequently the draw results were annulled. Repeat draw was held the next day. The organizers were also criticized for inappropriate representational format.

Major events 
The draw attracted media attention first by unusual draw method, featuring skimpy dressed girl in a wind tunnel, catching paper strips with team names, and later by realizing that technical errors were made in team names and number of teams in the draw. The draw was abandoned and held again the next day, in a traditional ball-in-a-bowl manner.

As FC Stumbras club collapsed in June, the win in the 1/8 final tie was awarded to FK Žalgiris.

Both the police and the Lithuanian Football Federation have opened the investigations on match fixing in the semi-final match between FK Banga Gargždai and FK Palanga. Suspicious betting activity was reported by the local and the international betting companies.

Matches and Results

Match Calendar

Preliminary Round I 
The league that team represents is shown in brackets.

Preliminary Round II 

130 goals were scored in the 29 matches of the preliminary stage of the competition, averaging at 4.48 goals per match. An average of 72 spectators attended the matches.

1/16 final 

The 8 teams of the A Lyga have joined the 24 winning teams of Round II. The draw took place on 8 May 2019.

54 goals were scored in the 16 matches of this stage of the competition, averaging at 3.38 goals per match. An average of 120 spectators attended the matches.

1/8 final 

The 1/8 final draw took place on 30 May 10:00 EET, with live coverage through LFF YouTube and Facebook channels.

1/4 final 
The quarter final draw took place on 4 July.

1/2 final 
The semi final draw took place on 5 September.

Final 
For the third time in its history FK Sūduva Marijampolė has claimed the cup title.

References

External links
 Lietuvos Futbolas
 Lithuanian Football Federation

Lithuanian Football Cup seasons
2019 in Lithuanian football
Seasons in Lithuanian football
Lithuania
Lithuania